Harford is an unincorporated community located in Harford Township, Susquehanna County, Pennsylvania, United States.

References

Unincorporated communities in Susquehanna County, Pennsylvania
Unincorporated communities in Pennsylvania